Ruins photography, sometimes called ruin porn, is a movement in photography that takes the decay of the built environment (cities, buildings, or infrastructure) as its subject. While "ruins" may be broadly defined as the remnants of human achievement (e.g. the remains of ancient Sumer or Machu Picchu), "ruins photography" generally refers to the capture of urban decay in the post-industrial areas of the world. Ruins photography catalogues the abandonment and decline of cities most of all, and has sparked conversations about the role of art in various urban renewal, restoration, and conservation projects in cities throughout the globe.

Background 
The roots of ruins photography come from popular notions of the picturesque which would often feature motifs concerned with the aesthetics of abandoned and dilapidated architecture. Staples of ruins photography include abandoned houses, neglected factories left over from the Industrial Revolution or auto industry booms, as well as bridges, abandoned lots, tenant or apartment buildings, or gutted theaters or offices.

Photographer Camilo José Vergara helped to bring the style greater recognition in the 1990s with his books The New American Ghetto and American Ruins. In the 2010s, photographers Yves Marchand and Romain Meffre published The Ruins of Detroit which brought further interest.

The style relies heavily on lighting, detail close-ups, long shots, and digital imaging. Ruins photography is different from historical architectural photography in that it does not focus on comparisons between past and present, but instead focuses on the state of the subject and how it came to be dilapidated.

Reception 
Some critics liken ruins photography to exploitation, comparing its appeal to that of sensationalist pornography. While most regard it for aesthetic purposes, critics find fault with the style’s minimal attention to the cities and places visited.

John Patrick Leary, a professor at Wayne State University in Detroit, said: 

Others embrace ruins photography as a way of marketing for potential tourism, while yet others have insisted that it can serve as a powerful call to action. Responding to critics such as Leary, Detroit blogger James Griffioen suggested that there are different ways to mediatize urban and industrial decline:  one spectacular and sensational (exploitative), the other more responsible. 

Ruins photographers are responding to critics who suggest that the genre pays little attention to local stories, by bringing the histories of the places and structures they photograph into their narratives. However, this new wave of ruins photography—more sensitive to the histories of structures and cities—is being met by a new wave of criticism. Locals in Detroit, Chicago, and other Rust Belt cities most featured by ruins photographers, point to the continued absence of the people living among the ruins from such accounts.

See also
The Capital of the Ruins
 Dead malls
 Howard Mansfield
 Urban exploration

References

Further reading
Lyons, Siobhan (2018) Ruin Porn and the Obsession with Decay. Basingstoke: Palgrave

External links
"‘Ruin Porn’ — the Aftermath of the Beijing Olympics", International Herald Tribune, July 2012
"Beijing Olympic Venues ", Modern Day Ruins, August 2012

Photography by genre
Modern ruins